Sporting Clube de Portugal has a swimming section, based in Lisbon, Portugal, since 1921, and competes in Campeonato Nacional de Clubes de Natação (National Club Championship of Swimming). The club has achieved multiple trophies, especially in men, where is champion for the eighth consecutive year.

Sporting pools are located in Multidesportivo Sporting, a building near the José Alvalade Stadium.

Honours

Portuguese Championship - Men (8)
2011/12, 2012/13, 2013/14, 2014/15, 2015/16, 2016/17, 2017/18, 2018/19

Portuguese Championship - Women (6)
2000/01, 2001/02, 2002/03, 2003/04, 2004/05, 2005/06

Portuguese Cup - Formation (1)
2014–15

See also

List of Portuguese records in swimming

References

External links
Sporting CP Official Website 

Sporting CP sports
1921 establishments in Portugal
Swimming in Portugal
Swimming clubs